The New Zealand Machine Gun Corps was an administrative corps of the New Zealand Military Forces during the First World War. It was formed in early 1916, following the Gallipoli campaign in response to a need for more effective machine gun support. The corps initially comprised independent machine gun companies and a mounted machine gun squadron, although in 1918 the machine gun companies were brought together into a machine gun battalion. The New Zealand Machine Gun Corps was disbanded at the end of the war.

History

At the beginning of the First World War, each infantry battalion and mounted rifles regiment contained a single section equipped with two Maxim machine guns. The piecemeal distribution of guns and a lack of specialist training was detrimental to the effective utilization of machine gun fire. After the evacuation from Gallipoli, the New Zealand Expeditionary Force was reorganised. As part of the reorganisation the New Zealand Machine Gun Corps was formed. The infantry machine gun sections were detached from their battalions in March 1916 and formed into larger independent companies. Each company was equipped with sixteen Vickers machine guns, which were lighter and more reliable than the old Maxim guns, and each company was assigned to an infantry brigade. In July the machine gun sections of the mounted rifle regiments were also detached and formed into a machine gun squadron to support the New Zealand Mounted Rifles Brigade. The machine gun squadron utilized pack horses to carry their machine guns and were more mobile than the machine gun companies which supported the infantry brigades.

Initially three machine gun companies served with the New Zealand Division on the Western Front. Following the Battle of the Somme in 1916, the decision was made to form a divisional level machine gun company, which joined the New Zealand Division in February 1917. Another machine gun company was also formed in May 1917 to support the new 4th Infantry Brigade. The 4th Infantry Brigade and its associated machine gun company were disbanded in early 1918 due to manpower shortages and the remaining four machine gun companies were grouped together into a battalion in February 1918. The machine gun companies were also redesignated at this point with the 1st, 2nd, 3rd and 5th companies becoming the Auckland, Canterbury, Otago and Wellington companies respectively. Immediately following the end of the war the machine gun battalion took up occupation duties with the rest of the New Zealand Division in Cologne and was disbanded in early 1919.

The 1st Machine Gun Squadron served with the New Zealand Mounted Rifles Brigade in Sinai and Palestine as part of the Desert Mounted Corps. In June 1918 the Imperial Camel Corps Brigade was disbanded and the New Zealand cameliers of the 15th and 16th companies were converted into the 2nd Machine Gun Squadron. The 2nd Machine Gun Squadron served with the newly formed 5th Light Horse Brigade, which had been formed from former Australian cameliers and an attached French mounted regiment.  At the end of the war the New Zealand mounted units moved to Egypt and helped to suppress the Egyptian Revolt. Both Machine gun squadrons were disbanded in March 1919.

List of units

See also

Machine Gun Corps
Australian Machine Gun Corps
Canadian Machine Gun Corps
27th Machine-Gun Battalion

Notes

References

Military units and formations established in 1916
Military units and formations disestablished in 1919
Administrative corps of New Zealand